The 1915 California Golden Bears football team was an American football team that represented the University of California, Berkeley during the 1915 college football season. The team competed as an independent under head coach Jimmie Schaeffer and compiled a record of 8–5. This was Cal's first season of football since 1905 and final season as an independent.

Schedule

References

California
California Golden Bears football seasons
California Golden Bears football